Walter Brooks (1 April 183214 March 1907) was a Professor of Music and an organist based in Birmingham.

Life

He was born in Longdon, Worcestershire in 1832, to William Brooks and Elizabeth. He was a chorister and assistant organist in Gloucester Cathedral to John Arnott.
 
He held the position of organist at St Martin in the Bull Ring, Birmingham for nearly 44 years until in 1900 he was forced to resign on account of ill health. He also lectured at Queen's College, Birmingham (a predecessor college of the University of Birmingham) giving lessons in music and singing. He was also conductor of the Tamworth Musical Society.

He married Anne Simmons, daughter of Thomas Simmons, on 4 August 1858 in St. Mary's Church, Atherstone, and had the following children:
Arthur C Brooks 
Mary L Brooks
Clara Brooks
Bertha Brooks

Appointments

Organist at Upton St. Leonards
Organist at Christ Church, Hampstead
Organist at St. Mary's Church, Atherstone 1854–1857
Organist at Birmingham Parish Church 1857–1900

References

1832 births
1907 deaths
English organists
British male organists
English composers
Academics of the University of Birmingham
19th-century English musicians
19th-century British male musicians
19th-century organists